Minuscule 156 (in the Gregory-Aland numbering), ε 206 (Soden), is a Greek minuscule manuscript of the New Testament, on parchment. Paleographically it has been assigned to the 12th century. It has marginalia.

Description 

The codex contains a complete text of the four Gospels on 244 parchment leaves (size ). The text is written in one column per page, in 23 lines per page (size of text 8.2 by 6.7 cm). Titles are in gold.

There is also another division into smaller the Ammonian Sections (in Mark 241 sections - the last in 16:20), but without references to the Eusebian Canons.

Text 

The Greek text of the codex is a representative of the Byzantine text-type. Hermann von Soden included it to the textual family Family Kx. Aland placed it in Category V.
According to the Claremont Profile Method it belongs to the textual family Family Kx in Luke 10 and Luke 20. In Luke 1 it has mixed Byzantine text.

History 

On the first of its page it is written: "Ex bibliotheca [Melchioris] Goldasti" († 1625).

The manuscript was given by Christina of Sweden to Cardinal Decio Azzolino, and bought from him by Pope Alexander VII — like codices 154, 155, 181.

It was examined by Birch (about 1782), Scholz, and Oscar von Gebhardt (in 1882). C. R. Gregory saw it in 1886.

It is currently housed at the Vatican Library (Reg. gr. 189), at Rome.

See also 
 List of New Testament minuscules
 Biblical manuscript
 Textual criticism

References

Further reading

External links 
 

Greek New Testament minuscules
12th-century biblical manuscripts
Manuscripts of the Vatican Library